is a Japanese former professional footballer who played as a midfielder. He played for the Japan national team.

Club career
Hirano attended Shimizu Commercial High School, where he won the All-Japan High School Championship in 1991.

Hirano began his professional career in the J1 League in 1993 with Nagoya Grampus Eight, winning the Emperor's Cup in 1995 and 1999 and the Japanese Super Cup in 1996, and scoring 43 goals in 213 appearances for the team. He transferred to Kyoto Purple Sanga in 2000, and although his team won promotion from the J2 League in 2001, he played just 5 league games before moving on to Júbilo Iwata.

After brief and largely unremarkable stints at Vissel Kobe, Tokyo Verdy, Yokohama F. Marinos and Omiya Ardija, Hirano moved to North America and signed for Vancouver Whitecaps in the USL First Division in 2008.

On September 30, 2008, Hirano was called up to the USL First Division All-League Team, and on October 12, 2008, helped the Whitecaps capture their second USL First Division Championship by beating the Puerto Rico Islanders 2–1 in the USL1 Championship game.

On January 20, 2009 the Whitecaps announced a contract extension for Hirano for the 2009 season.

Hirano announced his retirement from the game in January 2011.

International career
Hirano played for the Japan U-20 national team which competed at the 1992 AFC Youth Championship.

On June 8, 1997, he debuted and scored a goal for Japan national team against Croatia. He also played at 1998 World Cup qualification in 1997. In 1998, he was selected Japan for 1998 World Cup. He played two games as a substitute at the 1998 World Cup. He played 15 games and scored 4 goals for Japan until 2000.

Career statistics

Club

International

Scores and results list Japan's goal tally first, score column indicates score after each Hirano goal.

Honors
Nagoya Grampus Eight
 Emperor's Cup: 1995, 1999
 Japanese Super Cup: 1996

Tokyo Verdy 1969
 Emperor's Cup: 2004
 Japanese Super Cup: 2005

Vancouver Whitecaps
 USL First Division Championship: 2008
Vancouver Whitecaps Outstanding Defender: 2009
Vancouver Whitecaps Newcomer of the Year: 2008

References

External links

Japan National Football Team Database

Vancouver Whitecaps bio

1974 births
Living people
Association football people from Shizuoka Prefecture
Japanese footballers
Association football midfielders
Japan international footballers
1998 FIFA World Cup players
J1 League players
USL First Division players
USSF Division 2 Professional League players
Nagoya Grampus players
Kyoto Sanga FC players
Júbilo Iwata players
Vissel Kobe players
Tokyo Verdy players
Yokohama F. Marinos players
Omiya Ardija players
Vancouver Whitecaps (1986–2010) players
Japanese expatriate footballers
Japanese expatriate sportspeople in Canada
Expatriate soccer players in Canada